My Name Is Vendetta is a 2022 Italian crime action film directed by Cosimo Gomez.

Cast

See also 
 List of Italian films of 2022

References

External links

2022 films
2020s Italian-language films
2022 crime action films
Films set in Milan
Italian crime action films
Italian films about revenge
Italian-language Netflix original films
Films about the 'Ndrangheta
2020s Italian films